Legend is an unincorporated community in Alberta, Canada within the County of Forty Mile No. 8. It is located along Highway 61 between Range Road 125 and Range Road 130, in southeast Alberta. It is one of many ghost towns along the historic Red Coat Trail route.

Legend once had two grain elevators, both of which were demolished in the late 1990s. Only one of the United Grain Growers annexes remains on a farm south of Nemiscam.

See also 
List of communities in Alberta

References

External links 
Legend, Alberta at Google Maps

Ghost towns in Alberta
Localities in the County of Forty Mile No. 8